Íntimo is the fourth studio album by American singer Nicky Jam. It was released on November 1, 2019, by Sony Music Latin.  The album was promoted by a documentary.

Track listing

Charts

Weekly charts

Year-end charts

Certifications

References

2019 albums
Nicky Jam albums